Owsley is the debut album by American singer-songwriter Owsley, released on Giant Records in 1999. The album was nominated for a Grammy Award for Best Engineered Album.

Critics have noted musical influences from 1970s pop rock, including The Beatles, Todd Rundgren, and The Cars.

Owsley recorded the album in his own home studio, funded largely by his work as guitarist in Amy Grant's touring band.

Track listing

Personnel 
 Will Owsley – vocals (except 5-instrumental-out), all guitars, bass (2, 3, 5, 9, 10, 11), Echoplex (2), Mellotron (3, 11), Wurlitzer electric piano (3), Hammond B3 organ (3), Chamberlin (3), acoustic piano (8, 10)
 Jonathan Hamby – Hammond B3 organ (1, 4, 5), Minimoog (2), Wurlitzer electric piano (5, 6), Chamberlin (6)
 Phil Madeira – Hammond B3 organ (9)
 Millard Powers – bass (1, 3, 5-instrumental-out, 6), backing vocals (3), Minimoog solo (7)
 Spencer Campbell – bass (4, 8), string parts (6)
 Bob Parr – bass (7)
 Chris McHugh – drums,  percussion (4, 5, 7, 9)
 John Catchings – cello (3)
 John Mark Painter – string parts (3)
 Rebecca Walker – backing vocals (7, 11)

Production 
 Chris McHugh – executive producer 
 Will Owsley – producer, engineer (4, 8), mix assistant (9)
 Millard Powers – producer (1, 3, 6), engineer (1, 3, 6, 7), mixing (9)
 Jeff Balding – producer (9, 10, 11), engineer (10, 11)
 J.R. McNeely – engineer (2, 5), mixing (5-instrumental-out, 6, 8, 10, 11)
 Shane Wilson – engineer (3), recording (5-instrumental-out)
 J.C. Monterrosa – assistant engineer (2, 5)
 Todd Gunnerson – assistant engineer (6, 8, 10, 11)
 Tom Lord-Alge – mixing (1-5, 7)
 Mauricio Iragorri – mix assistant (1-5, 7)
 Fred Paragano – digital editing
 Bob Ludwig – mastering at Gateway Mastering (Portland, Maine)
 Warren Entner – career direction
 John Dittmar – booking (Pinnacle Entertainment)
 Mike Dewdney – international booking (ITB)
 Jeff Aldrich – A&R direction
 Karen Lichtman – album coordination
 Stephen Walker – art direction
 Airedale Brothers – photography
 Sean Dungan – photography
 John Clark – photography

References 

1999 debut albums
Owsley (musician) albums
Giant Records (Warner) albums